Sanjit Biswas is an American Internet entrepreneur and computer scientist and co-founder of Samsara, an Internet of Things company headquartered in San Francisco, California that provides hardware and software for physical operations. He also co-founded and served as CEO of Meraki, Inc. (now Cisco Meraki), a cloud-managed networking company now part of Cisco Systems.

Biswas has a bachelor's degree from Stanford and a master's degree from MIT.

In 2007, he was named to the MIT Technology Review TR35 as one of the top 35 innovators in the world under the age of 35.

References 

Living people
Year of birth missing (living people)
1980s births
Stanford University alumni
Cisco people
American people of Indian descent
American businesspeople